Manuel Schmid (born August 23, 1981) is an Austrian professional association football player who played in the Bundesliga for Altach and Kapfenberg. He can play as a right midfielder but also right back.

References

1981 births
Living people
Austrian footballers
Association football midfielders
SC Rheindorf Altach players
FC Wacker Innsbruck (2002) players
Kapfenberger SV players
People from Kitzbühel
Footballers from Tyrol (state)